War Inc. (Project Airos in Australia and Germany) is a real-time strategy video game developed by Optik Software. It was published by Interactive Magic for DOS on August 31, 1997. It incorporates a rudimentary stock market, placing the player directly in control of research and development, and the ability to completely customize units by using a variety of components.

Reception

GameSpot gave War Inc. an overall score of 5.2 out of ten, expressing that the game 'doesn't meet its potential' in that it has innovative and 'varied' gameplay options, but its combat and map design is "subpar" and "boring". Game Revolution praised War Inc.'s 'varied' technology trees and high degree of unit customization, further expressing that War Inc. sets itself apart from the "stagnating genre of real-time strategy games", giving it an overall score of a B+.

References

External links 
 War Inc. (PC) page at GameSpot
 

1997 video games
DOS games
DOS-only games
Free-to-play video games
Real-time strategy video games
Video games developed in the United States
Video games set in a fictional country